|}

The Hampton Novices' Chase is a Grade 2 National Hunt steeplechase in Great Britain which is open to horses aged five years or older. It is run at Warwick over a distance of 3 miles (4828 metres), and during its running there are eighteen fences to be jumped. The race is for novice chasers, and it is scheduled to take place each year in January.

The race was given Listed status in 2015 and achieved Grade Two status in 2020.

See also
 Horse racing in Great Britain
 List of British National Hunt races

References
 Racing Post:

National Hunt races in Great Britain
Warwick Racecourse
National Hunt chases